Barbara "Bobo" Lewis (May 14, 1926 – November 6, 1998) was an American comedic actress of film, musical theatre, stage and television.

Born in Miami, Florida, Lewis studied acting and won a Drama Desk Award in 1978 for portraying a teacher in Working on Broadway. In 1997, she was nominated for a Joseph Jefferson Award.

Stage roles
The Musical Comedy Murders of 1940 (as Bernice Roth); April 6, 1987 - August 1, 1987
42nd Street (as Maggie Jones; replacement); July 21, 1987 - January 8, 1989
Working (as Fran Swenson, Grace Clements, Lucille Page and Rose Hoffman); May 14, 1978 - June 4, 1978
Lorelei (as Mrs. Ella Spofford; replacement); January 27, 1974 -November 3, 1974
The Women (as Dowager and as Olga); April 25, 1973 - June 17, 1973
Twigs (as Emily, Celia, Dorothy and Ma; standby); November 14, 1971 - July 23, 1972

Television
Bobo Lewis was most famous for her role as gossip Midge Smoot on the children's television series Shining Time Station. She  remained with the show for its entire run from 1989 to 1993. Lewis would later appear in the four succeeding Shining Time Specials in 1995. Her other television appearances include roles on sitcoms such as Bewitched, The Monkees, That Girl, and Gomer Pyle, U.S.M.C..

Film
Bobo was seen in a handful of well-known films such as It's a Mad, Mad, Mad, Mad World (1963), Under the Yum Yum Tree (1963), Way...Way Out (1966) Can't Stop the Music (1980), Arthur (1981) Her Alibi (1989), Miami Blues (1990) and The Paper (1994).

Legacy
She teamed up with her Broadway co-star Lynne Thigpen (Working, 1978) to create the Lynne Thigpen-Bobo Lewis Foundation "to help young actresses and actors learn how to survive and succeed in New York theater".

Death
Lewis died on November 6, 1998, at New York Hospital in Manhattan from cancer, aged 72.

Filmography

References

External links
   
http://www.ibdb.com/person.asp?id=71052
http://www.tv.com/bobo-lewis/person/44665/summary.html
https://www.nytimes.com/1998/11/13/arts/bobo-lewis-72-longtime-actress-in-circle-repertory.html

1926 births
1998 deaths
Actresses from Florida
American musical theatre actresses
American stage actresses
American television actresses
Actresses from Miami
Drama Desk Award winners
Deaths from cancer in New York (state)
20th-century American actresses
20th-century American singers
20th-century American women singers